Jamie Delgado and Ken Skupski were the defending champions, but decided not to participate together.
Delgado played alongside Andreas Siljeström, but they lost to Philipp Marx and Florin Mergea in the second round, while Skupski partnered with Andreas Beck, but they lost to Dustin Brown and Rameez Junaid in the first round.
Andre Begemann and Martin Emmrich defeated Marx and Mergea 7–6(7–4), 6–3 in the final to win the title.

Seeds

Draw

Draw

References
 Main Draw

Roma Openandnbsp;- Doubles
2013 Doubles